Frontiers in Biology was a bimonthly peer-reviewed scientific journal covering the field of biology. It was established in 2006 and was published by Higher Education Press and Springer Science+Business Media, supervised by the Ministry of Education of China. The editor-in-chief is Hongjun Song (Johns Hopkins University). The journal ceased publication at the end of 2018.

Abstracting and indexing 

The journal is abstracted and indexed in Chemical Abstracts Service, ProQuest databases, Chinese Science Citation Database, and EMBiology.

References

External links 
 

Biology journals
Publications established in 2006
Bimonthly journals
Springer Science+Business Media academic journals
English-language journals